was a Japanese surgeon and Rangaku expert living during the late Edo period and early Meiji era. He was the first surgeon to give a cowpox vaccine in Japan, between 1858 and 1860.

Itō Genboku's offices were later expanded into the foundations of the incipient University of Tokyo Institute of Medical Science.

References

Japanese surgeons
Japanese immunologists
People of Edo-period Japan
People of Meiji-period Japan
1801 births
1871 deaths